The Skhul/Qafzeh hominins or Qafzeh–Skhul early modern humans are hominin fossils discovered in Es-Skhul and Qafzeh caves in Israel. They are today classified as Homo sapiens, among the earliest of their species in Eurasia. Skhul Cave is on the slopes of Mount Carmel; Qafzeh Cave is a rockshelter near Nazareth in Lower Galilee.

The remains found at Es Skhul, together with those found at the Nahal Me'arot Nature Reserve and Mugharet el-Zuttiyeh, were classified in 1939 by Arthur Keith and Theodore D. McCown as Palaeoanthropus palestinensis, a descendant of Homo heidelbergensis.

History

The remains exhibit a mix of traits found in archaic and anatomically modern humans. They have been tentatively dated at about 80,000–120,000 years old using electron paramagnetic resonance and thermoluminescence dating techniques. The brain case is similar to modern humans, but they possess brow ridges and a projecting facial profile like Neanderthals. They were initially regarded as transitional from Neanderthals to anatomically modern humans, or as hybrids between Neanderthals and modern humans. Neanderthal remains have been found nearby at Kebara Cave that date to 61,000–48,000 years ago, but it has been hypothesised that the Skhul/Qafzeh hominids had died out by 80,000 years ago because of drying and cooling conditions, favouring a return of a Neanderthal population suggesting that the two types of hominids never made contact in the region. A more recent hypothesis is that Skhul/Qafzeh hominids represent the first exodus of modern humans from Africa around 125,000 years ago, probably via the Sinai Peninsula, and that the robust features exhibited by the Skhul/Qafzeh hominids represent archaic sapiens features rather than Neanderthal features. The discovery of modern human made tools from about 125,000 years ago at Jebel Faya, United Arab Emirates, in the Arabian Peninsula, may be from an even earlier exit of modern humans from Africa. In January 2018 it was announced that modern human finds at the Mount Carmel cave of Misliya, discovered in 2002, had been dated to around 185,000 years ago, giving an even earlier date for an out-of-Africa migration.

Ian Wallace and John Shea have devised a methodology for examining the various Middle paleolithic core assemblages present at the Levant site in order to test whether the different hominid populations had distinct mobility patterns. They use a ratio of "formal" and "expedient" cores within assemblages to demonstrate either early Homo sapiens or Neanderthal mobility patterns, and thus categorize site occupations. In 2005, a set of 7 teeth from Tabun Cave in Israel were studied and found to most likely belong to a Neanderthal that may have lived around 90,000 years ago, and another Neanderthal (C1) from Tabun was estimated to be ~122,000 years old. If the dates are correct for these individuals, then it is possible that Neanderthals and early moderns did make contact in the region and it may be possible that the Skhul and Qafzeh hominids are partially of Neanderthal descent. Non-African modern humans contain 1–4% Neanderthal genetic material, with hybridisation possibly having taken place in the Middle East. It has been suggested, however, that the Skhul/Qafzeh hominids represent an extinct lineage. If this is the case, modern humans would have re-exited Africa around 70–50,000 years ago, crossing the narrow Bab-el-Mandeb strait between Eritrea and the Arabian Peninsula. This is the same route proposed to have been taken by the people who made the modern tools at Jebel Faya.

Skhul
The Skhul remains (Skhul 1–9) were discovered between 1929 and 1935 in the Es-Skhul Cave on Mount Carmel. The remains of seven adults and three children were found, some of which (Skhul 1, 4, and 5) are claimed to have been burials. Assemblages of perforated Nassarius shells (a marine genus), which are significantly different from local fauna, have also been recovered from the area, suggesting that these people may have collected and employed the shells as beads, as they are unlikely to have been used as food.

Skhul Layer B has been dated to an average of 81,000–101,000 years ago with the electron spin resonance method, and to an average of 119,000 years ago with the thermoluminescence method.

Skhul 5
Skhul 5 had the mandible of a wild boar on its chest. The skull displays prominent supraorbital ridges and jutting jaw, but the rounded braincase of modern humans. When found, it was assumed to be an advanced Neanderthal, but is today generally assumed to be a modern human, if a very robust one.

Qafzeh

Qafzeh cave opens onto a wall of Wadi el Hadj in the flank of Mount Precipice. Excavation of the cave by René Neuville began in 1934 and resulted in the discovery of the remains of 5 individuals in the Mousterian stratigraphic levels, which was then called the Levalloiso-Mousterian (see Levallosian). The lower layers of the cave were later dated to 92,000 years ago, and a series of hearths, several human bodies, flint artifacts (side scrapers, disc cores, and points), animal bones (gazelle, horse, fallow deer, wild ox, and rhinoceros), a collection of sea shells, lumps of red ochre, and an incised cortical flake were found.

The remains of 15 hominids, 8 of them children, were recovered in total from Qafzeh within a Mousterian archaeological context and dated to ca. 95,000 years ago. Remains of Qafzeh 8, 9, 10, 11, 13 and 15 were burials.

The marine shells (Glycymeris bivalves) were brought from Mediterranean Sea shore some 35 km away, and were recovered from layers earlier than most of the bodies save one. The shells were complete, naturally perforated, and several showed traces of having been strung (perhaps as a necklace), and a few had ochre stains on them.

The various layers at Qafzeh were dated to an average of 96,000–115,000 years ago with the electron spin resonance method and 92,000 years ago with the thermoluminescence method.

Qafzeh 9 and 10
Two skeletons were found in 1969 in the same burial, the skeleton of a late adolescent which sex is debated (Qafzeh 9), and the skeleton of a young child (Qafzeh 10). Qafzeh 9 has a high forehead, lack of occipital bun, a distinct chin, but an orthognathic face. Qafzeh 9 offers the earliest evidence of associated mandibular and dental pathological conditions (i.e. non-ossifying fibroma of the mandible, pre-eruptive intracoronal resorption and osteochondritis dissecans of the temporomandibular joint) among early anatomically modern humans

Qafzeh 11

Found in 1971 was the body of an adolescent (aged about 13 years) found in a pit dug in the bedrock. The skeleton was lying on its back, with the legs bent to the side and both hands placed on either side of the neck, and in the hands were the antlers of a large red deer clasped to the chest.

Qafzeh 12
A child of about 3 years old who manifests with skeletal abnormalities that indicate hydrocephalus.

Qafzeh 25
Qafzeh 25 was discovered in 1979. Due to his overall robustness and tooth wear, the remains are believed to be of a young male. The fossil has undergone heavy taphonomical damages including a complete crushing of the skull and mandible. Its inner ear morphology confirm that it is an anatomically modern human

See also
Archaeology of Israel
Manot 1
Qesem cave

References

External links
 Skhūl  anthropological and archaeological site, Israel
 Qafzeh IX / Skhul 9 Images at Modern Human Origins
 BBC - Cave Colours reveal Mental Leap
 Selected excerpt on Jebel Qafzeh from 'The Neolithic of the Levant' by Andrew M. T. Moore - Oxford University

Anthropology
Recent African origin of modern humans
Middle Stone Age
Homo fossils
Homo sapiens fossils
Prehistoric Israel
Mount Carmel